TRIO Sarajevo is a graphic design group based in Sarajevo.

Overview

Bojan Hadzihalilovic  and Dada Hadžihalilović (together with a third artist, Lela Mulabegović Hatt) make up the design group "TRIO Sarajevo". Formed in 1985, originally as a three-person design team composed of graduates from the Sarajevo Academy of fine arts, TRIO were part of the particular Sarajevo generation which was raised on the punk culture and pop-art movements. 

By the late-1980s TRIO had become one of the busiest and easily the most innovative design company in former Yugoslavia. Their first widely acclaimed work was a redesign of the famous Beatles album cover Sergeant Pepper for the pop-rock group Plavi Orkestar (Blue Orchestra), which sold almost half a million copies. From there TRIO went on to create designs for a number of other bands, theatre companies and art and culture-based magazines.

Awards

In 1989 TRIO won a Saatchi & Saatchi award for their work at a TV and marketing festival in Slovenia, and subsequently spent three months working at Saatchi & Saatchi's Belgrade office.

Press coverage

TRIO's work has been written about in both the news and art press. Among English language publications which have covered the life and work of TRIO are: The Independent, The Guardian, Newsweek, The Scotsman, Art Press, Creative Review.

Graphic design studios